The Putnupys is a river of  Kėdainiai district municipality, Kaunas County, central Lithuania. It originates in the Pernarava-Šaravai Forest, 3 km from Skaistgiriai village. The Putnupys flows to the south east, at first through the forest, later through the agriculture fields. It meets the Šušvė from the right side nearby Kampai I village.

The river passes through Būdai, Prapuoleniai, Kampai II, Kampai I villages.

The name Putnupys possibly comes from the Lithuanian suriname Putna.

References

Rivers of Lithuania
Kėdainiai District Municipality